Živko Radišić (15 August 1937 – 5 September 2021) was a Bosnian Serb politician who served as the 2nd Serb member of the Presidency of Bosnia and Herzegovina from 1998 to 2002.

Previously, from 1977 until 1982, he was the mayor of Banja Luka.

Career
Born in Prijedor, Kingdom of Yugoslavia, present-day Bosnia and Herzegovina, on 15 August 1937, Radišić graduated in 1964 from the University of Sarajevo Faculty of Political Science.

During the 1969 Banja Luka earthquake, he was a high ranking Banja Luka city government official, and thus, was directly in charge of repairing the consequences from the earthquake. Later on, from 1977 until 1982, Radišić served as the mayor of Banja Luka. From 1982 to 1985, he headed the defence ministry of SR Bosnia and Herzegovina. In 1996, he became a founding member of the Socialist Party of Bosnia and Herzegovina.

Radišić was elected Serb member of the Bosnian Presidency at the 1998 general election, defeating the incumbent Momčilo Krajišnik by 45,000 votes. He chaired the Presidency from 1998 until 1999 and again from 2000 until 2001. Radišić decided not to run for a second term in the Presidency at the 2002 general election. His term ended on 28 October 2002, and was succeeded as the Serb member by Mirko Šarović.

Personal life
Živko was married to Draginja Radišić and spent most of their life living in Banja Luka.

He died on 5 September 2021, aged 84, in a Banja Luka hospital.

References

External links

1937 births
2021 deaths
People from Prijedor
Serbs of Bosnia and Herzegovina
University of Sarajevo alumni
Mayors of Banja Luka
Politicians of Republika Srpska
Socialist Party (Bosnia and Herzegovina) politicians
Members of the Presidency of Bosnia and Herzegovina
Chairmen of the Presidency of Bosnia and Herzegovina